Filip Krivošík (born 27 March 1999) is a Slovak professional ice hockey forward who is currently playing for HK Nitra in the Slovak Extraliga

Career
Krivošík joined HPK in 2016 and made his debut for the senior team the following year. He has also played for Lempäälän Kisa of the second-tier Mestis in a loan spell during the 2017-18 season.

Career statistics

Regular season and playoffs

International

References

External links

1999 births
Living people
HPK players
Lempäälän Kisa players
Slovak ice hockey centres
Ice hockey people from Bratislava
SaiPa players
HK Nitra players
Slovak expatriate ice hockey players in the Czech Republic
Slovak expatriate ice hockey players in Finland